Henri Louis Hérouin, Sr. (born 19 February 1876 in Congis-sur-Thérouanne, date of death unknown) was a French competitor in the sport of archery. Hérouin won the first prize, and is now considered by the International Olympic Committee to have won the gold medal, in the 50 metre Au Cordon Doré event at the first Olympic appearance of archery, in the 1900 Summer Olympics in Paris. His score of 31 put him 2 points above his closest competitor Hubert Van Innis.

Hérouin also beat van Innis in the Championnat du Monde event, 22-16.  This event is not considered Olympic by the IOC.

See also
 Archery at the 1900 Summer Olympics

Notes
  - Prizes at the time were silver medals for first place and bronze medals for second, as well as usually including cash awards.  The current gold, silver, bronze medal system was initiated at the 1904 Summer Olympics.

References

External links

 

1876 births
Archers at the 1900 Summer Olympics
Olympic archers of France
Olympic gold medalists for France
French male archers
Year of death missing
Olympic medalists in archery
Medalists at the 1900 Summer Olympics
People from Meaux
Sportspeople from Seine-et-Marne
Place of death missing